Desi Routz is a Punjabi music composer duo consisting of Hardeep Singh Khangura and Jaspreet Singh. The duo Known predominantly for their compositions in Punjabi music.
They have worked with artists such as Ranjit Bawa, Babbal Rai, Akhil, Jassi Gill, Nimrat Khaira, Sunanda Sharma, Kulwinder Billa, Mankirt Aulakh and Prabh Gill.

Discography

Awards and nominations

References 

Indian composers
Indian musical duos
Living people
Year of birth missing (living people)